Alfred Onslow Glasse  (4 December 1889 – 13 December 1977) was a New Zealand electrical engineer and local-body politician. He was chief engineer of the Auckland Electric Power Board for 29 years, and served as president of the New Zealand Institution of Engineers in 1942–43. Glasse was later elected as an Auckland City Councillor, and was deputy mayor from 1962 to 1970.

Biography

Early life
Glasse was born in Dunedin in 1889 and was educated at Otago Boys' High School, Dunedin Technical College and then the University of Otago.

He trained as an engineer and travelled to Britain to gain further experience at the Thomson-Houston Electric Company, a large firm of electrical engineers. During World War I he enlisted in the New Zealand Expeditionary Force in 1914 and was awarded the Military Cross and mentioned in dispatches. Following the war he returned to work with the same firm.

Career
In 1922 the Thomson-Houston Company secured a contract for the supply of machinery and equipment to the Auckland City Council. Glasse was assigned back to New Zealand as the company's supervising engineer where he led the installation work of the new machinery. He subsequently joined the Auckland Electric Power Board as assistant engineer and after a few months was appointed chief engineer, holding the position until he retired 29 years later in 1954. He served as vice-president of the Institution from 1940 to 1942 and was president from 1942 to 1943. He also served as president of the Electric Supply Authority Engineers' Institute (1947–48).

In the 1952 Queen's Birthday Honours, Glasse was appointed an Officer of the Order of the British Empire, for services in the field of engineering.

Political involvement
Following his retirement from engineering, Glasse became involved in civic affairs in Auckland. In the 1956 local elections, he was elected as a member of the Auckland City Council on a Citizens & Ratepayers ticket. Between 1962 and 1970 he served as Deputy Mayor of Auckland City. Glasse supported mayor Dove-Myer Robinson's local government reforms to establish the Auckland Regional Authority. He was also a member of the Auckland Metropolitan Drainage Board and the Harbour Bridge Authority, finally retiring from public office in 1976.

In the 1969 Queen's Birthday Honours, Glasse was appointed a Companion of the Order of St Michael and St George, for services to the community and particularly to local government in Auckland.

Death and legacy
He died on 13 December 1977, aged 88.

The Alfred O. Glasse Award, an annual award by the New Zealand Planning Institute to recognize services to planning by non-planners, is named in Glasse's honour.

Notes

References

1889 births
1977 deaths
University of Otago alumni
New Zealand electrical engineers
New Zealand military personnel of World War I
Local politicians in New Zealand
Auckland City Councillors
Deputy mayors of places in New Zealand
New Zealand justices of the peace
New Zealand recipients of the Military Cross
New Zealand Officers of the Order of the British Empire
New Zealand Companions of the Order of St Michael and St George